VLR could refer to:

Visitor location register of a network switching subsystem
Delahaye VLR passenger vehicle 
Vic Lee Racing
Virginia Landmarks Register
Victorian Law Reports
Variable lymphocyte receptor
Vallenar Airport IATA code VLR
De Nederlandse Vereniging voor Lift- en Roltraptechniek (The Dutch Association of Lift and Escalator Engineering)
Vive le Revolution group co-founded by Roland Castro
Vellore Cantonment railway station 
Very Long Range aircraft, e.g. Consolidated B-24 Liberator
Zero Escape: Virtue's Last Reward, a video game